Nerpa may refer to:

Baikal seal (Pusa sibirica), a seal native to Lake Baikal, Siberia
Nerpa, Nepal
Russian submarine Nerpa (K-152), an Akula II class submarine